The Manchester British-Americans were an American basketball team based in Manchester, Connecticut that was a member of the American Basketball League (ABL). Boxer Ruby Goldstein once played for the team. He is one of the oldest people to have ever played in the ABL at 43 years 9 months and two days. The team played their home games at Manchester Armory.

Year-by-year

Legacy
Their name is not used anymore, however, a name like this helped spread the name of basketball to the UK where the Manchester Giants compete in the BBL (British Basketball League).

References

Defunct basketball teams in Connecticut
Sports in Manchester, Connecticut
American Basketball League (1925–1955) teams
Basketball teams established in 1951
Basketball teams disestablished in 1953
1951 establishments in Connecticut